Audrey Bastien (born 10 December 1991) is a French actress. She appeared in more than twenty films since 2010.

Selected filmography

References

External links 

1991 births
Living people
French film actresses